Earl Washington is the name of:

 Earl Washington, Jr. (born 1960), former Virginia death-row inmate whose conviction was overturned
 Earl Washington (musician) (1921–1975), jazz pianist
 E. M. Washington (Earl Marshawn Washington, born 1962), American entrepreneur, printmaker, engraver and counterfeiter